The Catch is the fifteenth studio album by the Scottish hard rock band Nazareth, released in 1984. The album in a way was a return to the Nazareth sound and tradition of the albums, covering songs like "Ruby Tuesday" and "Road to Nowhere".

Track listing

1997 Essential remaster bonus tracks

2002 30th Anniversary bonus tracks

2011 Salvo bonus tracks

The 2011 remastered CD release of The Catch was paired with Cinema

Personnel

Band members
 Dan McCafferty - vocals
 Manny Charlton - guitars
 Pete Agnew - bass, guitars
 Darrell Sweet - drums

Chart performance

References

Nazareth (band) albums
1984 albums
Vertigo Records albums